The United States District Court for the District of Potomac was a short-lived United States federal court. Named for the Potomac River, it had jurisdiction over the District of Columbia and pieces of Maryland and Virginia, making it the first (and one of the only) United States district courts to cross state lines. It was established in the Judiciary Act of 1801 – also known as the "Midnight Judges Act", because it sought to redistrict the federal courts to allow outgoing President John Adams to make additional appointments – and was abolished in the Judiciary Act of 1802. The language of the first Judiciary Act, setting forth the geographic jurisdiction of the District, was as follows:

See also
 Courts of Maryland
 Courts of Virginia
 List of courts of the District of Columbia

References

Potomac
1801 establishments in the United States
1802 disestablishments in the United States
Courts and tribunals established in 1801
Courts and tribunals disestablished in 1802